Ellen Amanda Hayes (September 23, 1851October 27, 1930) was an American mathematician and astronomer. She was a controversial figure, not only because of being a female college professor, but also for embracing many radical causes.

Early life
Hayes was born in Granville, Ohio, the first of six children to Ruth Rebecca (Wolcott) Hayes and Charles Coleman Hayes. At the age of seven she studied at the Centerville school, a one-room ungraded public school and, in 1867, at sixteen, was employed to teach at a country school. In 1872, she entered the preparatory department at Oberlin College and was admitted as a freshman in 1875, where her main studies were mathematics and science.

Work
Three years after admission, Hayes obtained her B.A. from Oberlin in 1878 and began teaching at Adrian College. Also active in astronomy, she determining the orbit of the newly discovered asteroid 267 Tirza while studying at the Leander McCormick Observatory at the University of Virginia.

From 1879 to her 1916 retirement, she taught at Wellesley College, where she became head of the mathematics department in 1888 and head of the new department in applied mathematics in 1897. According to one of her colleagues, she was removed from being head of the mathematics department due to disputes over her admission policy. She wore utilitarian clothes instead of the fashionable garments worn by many women of the day and she was described as "strong willed" at a time when, in contrast, a man might have been described as highly principled.

As a mathematics professor, she was described as controversial. She questioned the truth of the Bible in front of students. She had very high standards of education, giving more than half of her students D grades during the first year she taught from her trigonometry book. Despite her rigorous teaching style, nonetheless, she had a loyal following of students.

In 1888, she wrote a regular column for the Wellesley College newspaper discussing suffrage and dress reform, and in the 1890s she founded a chapter of the temperance movement.

In 1891, Hayes was elected one of the first six women to become members of the New York Mathematical Society (later the American Mathematical Society). She was named a Fellow of the American Association for the Advancement of Science in 1905.

It was written from the history of Wellesley College:

Women in math
Hayes was concerned about under-representation of women in mathematics and science and argued that this was due to social pressure, emphasis on female appearances, lack of employment opportunities for women in mathematics and science fields, and schools that allowed female students to opt out of mathematics and science courses.

Social causes
Hayes was a controversial figure not just for being one of the rare women among mathematics professors in nineteenth-century America, but for her embrace of radical causes such as questioning the Bible, gender-related clothing conventions, suffrage, temperance, socialism, the 1912 Lawrence Textile Strike, and Sacco and Vanzetti case.

She was the Socialist Party candidate for Massachusetts Secretary of State in 1912, the first woman in state history to run for statewide office. She did not win the race, but did receive more votes than any Socialist candidate on the ballot, including 2500 more than for their gubernatorial candidate. During the Russian Revolution, despite anti-Red sentiment, she raised money for Russian orphans and defended socialism. At the age of 76, she was arrested for marching in protest of the execution of Nicola Sacco and Bartolomeo Vanzetti.

Later life
Hayes wrote Wild Turkeys and Tallow Candles (1920), an account of life in Granville, and The Sycamore Trail (1929), a historical novel.

In 1929, she moved to West Park, New York to teach at Vineyard Shore School for women workers in industry, despite her pain from arthritis. She died on October 27, 1930. Her will left her brain to the Wilder Brain Collection at Cornell University. Her ashes were buried in Granville, Ohio.

References

External links
 
 

American women mathematicians
19th-century American mathematicians
20th-century American mathematicians
American women astronomers
19th-century American astronomers
20th-century American astronomers
Oberlin College alumni
Wellesley College faculty
People from Granville, Ohio
Socialist Party of America politicians from Massachusetts
Adrian College faculty
Writers from Massachusetts
Writers from Ohio
1851 births
1930 deaths
Whitin Observatory
20th-century women mathematicians
20th-century American women scientists
Fellows of the American Association for the Advancement of Science
19th-century American women scientists